WLNO (1060 AM) – branded WLNO 1060 AM – is a commercial urban gospel radio station licensed to serve New Orleans, Louisiana. Owned by Eternity Media Group LLC, the station serves the New Orleans metropolitan area. The WLNO transmitter site in located in Belle Chasse.

History
WLNO traces its roots back to January 6, 1924, when WABZ, a 50 W AM station licensed to Coliseum Place Baptist Church in New Orleans first went on air. The station changed its frequency, and call letters several times, becoming WBBX in 1933 and WBNO in 1934, before the license was acquired by former Louisiana Governor James A. Noe, who renamed the station WNOE in 1941. WNOE was the market's first Top 40 outlet during the 1950s, 1960s and 1970s. When it began broadcasting around the clock on February 14, 1955, it stunted by playing the record "Shtiggy Boom" by The Nuggets nonstop for 58 hours and 45 minutes. Some of the most famous disc jockeys on the 1960s WNOE included Gary Owens, Greg Mason, C. C. Courtney and Frank Jolley (with his alter-ego - Count Down).

With its big daytime signal, WNOE was even sometimes receivable in areas like Tampa if you were near the Gulf Of Mexico. WNOE abandoned its Top 40 format gradually in the early 1970s and evolved into one of the few Album Rock stations on AM dial in the U.S.  In a sense, rival WTIX had the market to itself during that time, though some FM stations flirted with formats musically close to Top 40. However, with the slogan Real Rock (a slam at WTIX, who without competition, had softened its top 40 sound considerably) WNOE returned to AOR leaning top 40 format in 1973, and competed vigorously with WTIX into the early 1980s. By 1977, WNOE was a pop leaning AOR station somewhat softer than its FM sister station.

On January 27, 1981, WNOE flipped to an adult contemporary-leaning Country music format, using crossover artists such as Kenny Rogers, Anne Murray, John Denver, Linda Rondstadt, Olivia Newton-John and Willie Nelson.  WNOE-FM, its sister station, had gone to a pure country format, also leaving album rock the previous August. WNOE moved away from an AC lean by 1985 but remained country. The station began to play more classic country and also play some southern sounding pop hits mixed in by 1990. WNOE stayed with this Country oldies format until March 1, 1995, when it was sold to Communicom Co. of Louisiana, L.P., who flipped it to its current format. Communicom Company of Louisiana, L.P. is a subsidiary of Denver-based Communicom Company, which also owns KXEG and KXXT in Phoenix, Arizona, and WDRJ in Detroit, Michigan.

On June 2, 2014, the station went dark. Effective January 9, 2015, WLNO's license was assigned to the WLNO Trust, due to the bankruptcy of Communicom. Effective December 16, 2015, WLNO was sold to Donald Pugh, Sr.'s Eternity Media Group LLC for $1,000 plus a $94,000 payment for access to station property. Pugh returned the station to the air, with an urban gospel format, with segments of the day sold to local preachers.

References

External links
FCC History Cards for WLNO

Radio stations in New Orleans
Radio stations established in 1956
1956 establishments in Louisiana